The women's tournament of volleyball at the 2013 Summer Universiade was held from 8 to 15 July in Kazan, Russia.

Preliminary round
The draw is as follows:

Group A

|}

|}

Group B

|}

|}

Group C

|}

|}

Group D

|}

|}

Classification rounds

Quarterfinal round

9th–15th place

|}

Semifinal round

13th–15th place

|}

9th–12th place

|}

5th–8th place

|}

Final round

13th-place game

|}

11th-place game

|}

9th-place game

|}

7th-place game

|}

5th-place game

|}

Elimination round

Quarterfinals

|}

Semifinals

|}

Bronze-medal match

|}

Gold-medal match

|}

Final standings

Individuals Awards

Most Valuable Player

Best Setter

Best Scorer

Best Spiker

Best Server

Best Blocker

Best Receiver

Best Digger

References

Women
Universiade